Metropolitan Iloilo–Guimaras, also shortened as Metro Iloilo–Guimaras or simply MIG, is a metropolitan area in the Visayas in the Philippines. It consists of the highly urbanized city of Iloilo City; the regional agro-industrial center of Pavia; the municipalities of Cabatuan, Leganes, Oton, San Miguel, and Santa Barbara; and the neighboring island province of Guimaras, with its five municipalities of Jordan, Buenavista, Nueva Valencia, San Lorenzo, and Sibunag.

Metro Iloilo–Guimaras is the only officially recognized metropolitan area in the Western Visayas region. It is the second largest metropolitan area in the Visayas after Metro Cebu, being the center of trade and commerce in the region.

The Metro Iloilo–Guimaras Economic Development Council (MIGEDC) is the agency responsible for the economic growth and development plans for Metro Iloilo and province of Guimaras. It was created by virtue of Executive Order 559, signed by President Gloria Macapagal-Arroyo on August 28, 2006.

History 
The Metropolitan Iloilo Development Council (MIDC) was created through a Memorandum of Agreement (MOA) dated February 9, 2001, by the City of Iloilo, along with four nearby municipalities: Oton, Pavia, San Miguel, and Leganes, to foster collaborative approaches aimed primarily at the economic and urbanization growth of the area. 

The Guimaras-Iloilo City Alliance (GICA) was also similarly created through a Memorandum of Agreement (MOA) entered into by Iloilo City and the Province of Guimaras on May 22, 2005, to effect mutually beneficial economic development with a special focus on tourism and infrastructure development.

The municipalities of Santa Barbara and Cabatuan, which both host the new international-standard Iloilo Airport, have similarly recognized the importance of intermodal transportation links and tourism development to overall economic development and have thus joined the metropolitan alliance.

The Metro Iloilo-Guimaras Economic Development Council (MIGEDC) is hereby created on August 28, 2006, through Executive Order No. 559, signed by President Gloria Macapagal-Arroyo. The agency formulates, coordinates, and monitors programs, projects, and activities for the acceleration of the economic growth and development of the City of Iloilo, the Municipalities of Oton, San Miguel, Pavia, Leganes, Santa Barbara, and Cabatuan, all of the Province of Iloilo, and the entire Province of Guimaras, in support of the Mega-Region Economic Development Strategy of the National Government.

Government 
The Metro Iloilo-Guimaras Economic Development Council is made up of 12 local government units (LGUs), including Iloilo City, which serves as the metropolitan's central core, and six municipalities in Iloilo Province and five municipalities in Guimaras Province.

Component local government units

Economy 
The economy of Metro Iloilo alone is one of the largest in the Visayas and the country. It serves as a center for trade, commerce, finance, technology, medical tourism, hospitality, real estate, tourism, education, and industry in the Western Visayas region. Major industries in the metropolis include the management of port facilities, telecommunications infrastructure and utilities, agriculture, banking and finance, retail trading, real estate, tourism, and business process outsourcing (BPO).

Aside from Iloilo City, the municipalities of Pavia, Oton, and Santa Barbara also serve as the three major commercial and business centers in the metropolitan area, where the large mixed-use development townships are mostly located outside Iloilo City.

Pavia, also being the agro-industrial center of the region, has 39 manufacturing establishments producing various products intended for the domestic and export markets. Among the important products are farm implements, milled rice, poultry and livestock feeds, noodles, soft drinks, dressed chicken, cooking oil, furniture, concrete products, polyurethane foam, and industrial and medical gases. Pavia is home to a number of prestigious manufacturing establishments. Among the biggest investors locators are; Coca-Cola Bottlers, Phils., Vitarich Corporation, Pryce Gases, Inc. Mandaue Foam Industries, Panay Tropical Grains Milling Corp., Jaspe Light Steel Indus.

The province of Guimaras is mainly agricultural, with mangoes, palay, coconuts, livestock, poultry, and fishing as major products. Its industries include tourism, fruit processing, coconut processing, fish farming, handicrafts, mining, quarrying, and lime production.

As the major economic hub and financial center of Western Visayas, an adequate and growing number of banks are establishing branches, leading to the metropolitan area having the third-most bank savings deposits and accounts in the Philippines.

Infrastructure developments

Roads 

The Sen. Benigno S. Aquino Jr. Avenue (Diversion Road), Mc Arthur Drive, Cong. Narciso Monfort Boulevard, Gen. Luna Street, CJ Ramon Avancena Street, E. Lopez Street, Pres. Corazon C. Aquino Avenue (Circumferencial Road 1 or C1), Iznart Street, and Mulle Loney Drive are Metro Iloilo's major roads. Sen. Benigno S. Aquino Jr. Avenue was renovated and widened into an 8-lane main road with a protected bike lane and a 2-lane service road. It connects Iloilo City, Pavia, Santa Barbara, and the Iloilo International Airport.

There are currently two operating vehicular overpasses or flyovers in Metro Iloilo; the Infante flyover and the Jalandoni flyover, both along General Luna Street in Iloilo City Proper. There are also a total of four new flyovers currently under construction. The two four-lane Ungka and Aganan flyovers, both located in Pavia; and the two two-lane Hibao-an and Buhang flyovers, crossing Mandurriao-San Miguel Road in Mandurriao district and Iloilo-Capiz Road in Jaro district, respectively, both along the Iloilo Circumferential Road.

The existing President Corazon C. Aquino Avenue, also known as Circumferencial Road 1 or C1, covers roads from Balabago, Jaro to San Jose, Arevalo, Iloilo City. There are also three new circumferential roads that are under construction within Metro Iloilo. Circumferential Road 2 (C2), from coastal Leganes to Cabugao, Pavia, and all the way to the Oton-San Jose San Miguel Road; Circumferential Road 3 (C3), from the coastal road Zarraga-Dumangas boundary to Zarraga town proper and all the way to Sta. Barbara; and Circumferential Road 4 (C4), from Barotac Nuevo to Southern Iloilo.

The construction of the Iloilo–Guimaras Bridge, a component of the Panay-Guimaras-Negros Bridge that will connect the entire metropolitan area as well as the whole Western Visayas region, is well underway.

Airport 
Iloilo International Airport (Iloilo Airport) is the airport serving the general area of Iloilo City, the capital city of the province of Iloilo and the regional center of the Western Visayas region in the Philippines. It opened its doors to commercial traffic on June 14, 2007, after a decade of planning and construction, replacing Mandurriao Airport in Iloilo City proper which had been in service for over seventy years. As a result, the new airport inherited its IATA and ICAO airport codes, as well as its position as the fourth-busiest airport in the Philippines, from its predecessor. In addition to being the first airport in both Western Visayas and the island of Panay to be built to international standards, it is considered one of four international airports in the Visayas with international flights to Hong Kong and Singapore.

The new Iloilo International Airport is located in Cabatuan; specifically in Barangay Tabucan, Barangay Gaub, Barangay Duyan-Duyan and Barangay Manguna, all in Cabatuan. The airport can be reached either from the Cabatuan access roads (Barangay Tabucan and Barangay Tiring, Cabatuan) or from the Pavia-Santa Barbara-Cabatuan (Barangay Duyan-Duyan, Cabatuan) access road. The airport complex consists of a single runway, various administrative and maintenance buildings, waste sorting and water treatment facilities, a power generating station, a cargo terminal and a main passenger terminal. Its location on the Tomas Confesor Highway, a major highway transversing the island, makes the airport accessible from all parts of Iloilo and Panay by road, while its proximity to the currently defunct Panay Railways network could potentially link the airport to the rest of Panay by rail.

Seaport

The Port of Iloilo is the port serving the general area of Iloilo and the rest of Panay Island and Guimaras Island.
There are 5 seaports in Metro Iloilo, these are the Iloilo Ferry Port and Terminal Complex,
Iloilo River Port and Terminal Complex, Iloilo Domestic Port and Terminal Complex, 
Dumangas Ro - Ro Port and Terminal Complex and The Iloilo Commercial Port Complex which is located on 20.8 hectares of reclaimed land. It has facilities that include 11,400 sq. meters of open space for operations, supplemented by a backup area of 97,000 sq. meters, a crane, rails of 348 lineal meters, roll-on/roll-off support, a freight station, and a 720 sq. meter passenger shed. The port complex is ideal for ships plying international routes having a berth length of 400 meters, a width of 26.26 meters and a berthing depth of 10.50 meters.

There are a number of shipping companies that use the Port of Iloilo, among them, the Aboitiz Shipping Company, Amigo Shipping Company, New Panay Shipping Company, Negros Navigation Company, Sulpicio Lines, William Lines, and Trans-Asia Shipping Lines. Fast ferries serve Iloilo-Bacolod routes eight times daily. Negros Navigation and Superferry dock to the city where it serves routes going to Manila, Bacolod, Cebu, Zamboanga and Cagayan de Oro City.

Fishing Port 

The only fishing port complex in the Visayas, the Iloilo Fish Port Complex is located at the mouth of the Batiano River on a reclaimed 20.5 hectare land.

Public-transport terminals 
Iloilo City boast of 5 integrated transport terminals, these are the Northern Iloilo Integrated Jeepney and Bus Terminal in Tagbac, Jaro. The Central Line Jeepney and Bus Terminal in Ungka, Jaro. The Upland Jeepney and Bus Terminal in Mandurriao. The Souther Coast Jeepney and Bus Terminal in Mohon, Arévalo and the North Coastal Jeepney and Bus Terminal in Ingore, La Paz.

Railway 
Proposed revival of the currently defunct Panay Railways, re-connect Iloilo City to Santa Barbara, which has a railway station and is home to the entrance of Iloilo International Airport in Cabatuan.

Education 

Metro Iloilo–Guimaras serves as one of the centers of education in the Philippines. There are a large number of educational institutions in the area serving the region of Western Visayas and other neighboring provinces. It has one of the highest numbers of universities in the country, with a total of nine universities. The following list represents some of the notable institutions in the metro:
 ACSI College Iloilo
 Cabalum Western College
 Central Philippine University
 Colegio de San Jose
 Colegio del Sagrado Corazon de Jesus
 Guimaras State University
 Hua Siong College of Iloilo
 Iloilo Doctors' College
 Iloilo Science and Technology University
 John B. Lacson Foundation Maritime University
 St. Paul University Iloilo
 St. Therese – MTC colleges
 University of Iloilo
 University of San Agustin
 University of the Philippines Visayas
 West Visayas State University
 Western Institute of Technology

Metro Iloilo–Guimaras Economic Development Council 

The Metro Iloilo–Guimaras Economic Development Council, or MIGEDC, was formally established by President Gloria Macapagal-Arroyo through Executive Order No. 559, signed on August 28, 2006. It evolved from the Metro Iloilo Development Council (MIDC) that was earlier established by the City of Iloilo and four neighboring municipalities of Leganes, Oton, Pavia, and San Miguel on February 9, 2001, and the Guimaras–Iloilo City Alliance (GICA) that was similarly established on May 22, 2005. Through Executive Order No. 559, the municipality of Santa Barbara became an addition together with the province of Guimaras. After the opening of the new Iloilo International Airport in the municipality of Cabatuan in 2007, the town was also added to the metropolitan.

During the MIGEDC press conference in March 2022, Iloilo City Mayor and MIGEDC Chairman Jerry P. Treñas revealed that the municipalities of Dumangas and Zarraga had expressed their intention to join the MIGEDC in the near future. Velma Jane Lao, MIGEDC Executive Director, is also on the work on the expansion of the council and will be confirming if the other municipalities that have long signified to join are still interested.

As a strengthened task group, the MIGEDC formulates, implements, coordinates, and monitors programs, projects, and activities that support the Mega-Region Economic Development Strategic Framework of the National Government. It was designed to help address the area’s emerging problems brought about by rapid urbanization and the spatial development challenges of tourism and economic development. The MIGEDC is gearing up to become a Smart Metropolitan.

The MIGEDC is composed of the following:

 Mayor, Iloilo City as Chairperson
 Provincial Governor, Province of Guimaras as Co-Chairperson
 Mayor, Municipality of Pavia, Iloilo
 Mayor, Municipality of San Miguel, Iloilo
 Mayor, Municipality of Oton, Iloilo
 Mayor, Municipality of Leganes, Iloilo
 Mayor, Municipality of Sta. Barbara, Iloilo
 Mayor, Municipality of Cabatuan, Iloilo
 President, League of Municipalities, Province of Guimaras

See also 

 Metro Manila
 Metro Cebu

References

External links
Metro Iloilo–Guimaras Economic Development Council – Official website
 

Iloilo Guimaras
Iloilo City
Guimaras